Spargania magnoliata, the double-banded carpet moth, is a species of geometrid moth in the family Geometridae. It is found in North America.

The MONA or Hodges number for Spargania magnoliata is 7312.

References

Further reading

External links

 

Hydriomenini
Articles created by Qbugbot
Moths described in 1858